Lionel Funes Díaz (born 1 July 1968) is a Mexican politician from the National Action Party. He served as Deputy of the LVIII Legislature of the Mexican Congress representing the State of Mexico, and previously in the LIII Legislature of the Congress of the State of Mexico.

References

1968 births
Living people
Politicians from the State of Mexico
National Action Party (Mexico) politicians
20th-century Mexican politicians
21st-century Mexican politicians
Members of the Congress of the State of Mexico
Deputies of the LVIII Legislature of Mexico
Members of the Chamber of Deputies (Mexico) for the State of Mexico